The Madagascar worm snake (Madatyphlops madagascariensis) is a species of snakes in the Typhlopidae family.

References

Madatyphlops
Reptiles described in 1877